Mapeta is a genus of moths belonging to the family Pyralidae.

Species include:
 Mapeta cynosura Druce, 1895
 Mapeta omphephora Dyar, 1914
 Mapeta schausi Druce, 1895 
 Mapeta xanthomelas Walker, 1863

References

 Pitkin & Jenkins (2004), and see references in Savela (2011)

External links
  (2011): Markku Savela's Lepidoptera and Some Other Life Forms – Mapeta. Version of 23 February 2011. Retrieved 29 May 2011.
 

Pyralinae
Pyralidae genera